Stenopogon is a genus of robber flies, insects in the family Asilidae. There are at least 200 described species in Stenopogon.

See also
 List of Stenopogon species

References

Further reading

External links

 

Asilidae genera
Articles created by Qbugbot